Team Galaxy may refer to:
Team Galactic, the main antagonists of Pokémon Diamond and Pearl
Team Galaxy (TV series), a 2006 French and Canadian animated series